James John McDonald (born 29 May 1967) is an Australian politician. He has been the Liberal National Party member for Lockyer in the Queensland Legislative Assembly since 2017.

References

Parliamentary Profile

1967 births
Living people
Members of the Queensland Legislative Assembly
Liberal National Party of Queensland politicians
21st-century Australian politicians